The California genocide was the killing of thousands of indigenous peoples of California by United States government agents and private citizens in the 19th century. It began following the American Conquest of California from Mexico, and the influx of settlers due to the California Gold Rush, which accelerated the decline of the indigenous population of California. Between 1846 and 1873, it is estimated that non-Natives killed between 9,492 and 16,094 California Natives. Hundreds to thousands were additionally starved or worked to death. Acts of enslavement, kidnapping, rape, child separation and displacement were widespread. These acts were encouraged, tolerated, and carried out by state authorities and militias.

The 1925 book Handbook of the Indians of California estimated that the indigenous population of California decreased from perhaps as many as 150,000 in 1848 to 30,000 in 1870 and fell further to 16,000 in 1900. The decline was caused by disease, low birth rates, starvation, killings, and massacres. California Natives, particularly during the Gold Rush, were targeted in killings. Between 10,000 and 27,000 were also taken as forced labor by settlers. The state of California used its institutions to favor white settlers' rights over indigenous rights, dispossessing natives.

Since the 2000s several American academics and activist organizations, both Native American and European American, have characterized the period immediately following the U.S. Conquest of California as one in which the state and federal governments waged genocide against the Native Americans in the territory. In 2019, California's governor Gavin Newsom apologized for the genocide and called for a research group to be formed to better understand the topic and inform future generations.

Background

Indigenous peoples

Prior to Spanish arrival, California was home to an indigenous population thought to have been as high as 300,000. The largest group were the Chumash people, with a population around 10,000. The region was highly diverse, with numerous distinct languages spoken. While there was great diversity in the area, archeological findings show little evidence of intertribal conflicts.

The various tribal groups appear to have adapted to particular areas and territories. According to journalist Nathan Gilles, because of traditions practiced by the Native people of Northern California, they were able to "manage the threat of wildfires and cultivate traditional plants". For example, traditional use of fire by Californian and Pacific Northwest tribes, allowed them to "cultivate plants and fungi" that "adapted to regular burning. The list runs from fiber sources, such as bear-grass and willow, to foodstuffs, such as berries, mushrooms, and acorns from oak trees that once made up sprawling orchards". Because of traditional practices of Native Californian tribes, they were able to support habitats and climates that would then support an abundance of wildlife, including rabbits, deer, varieties of fish, fruit, roots, and acorns. The natives largely followed a hunter-gatherer lifestyle, moving around their area through the seasons as different types of food were available.

The Native people of California, according to sociologist Kari Norgaard, were "hunting and fishing for their food, weaving baskets using traditional techniques" and "carrying out important ceremonies to keep the world intact". It was also recorded that the Indigenous people in California and across the continent had, and continue to, use "fire to enhance specific plant species, optimize hunting conditions, maintain open travel routes, and generally support the flourishing of the species upon which they depend, according to scholars like the United States Forest Service ecologist and Karuk descendent Frank Lake".

Contact
California was one of the last regions in the Americas to be colonized. Catholic Spanish missionaries, led by Franciscan administrator Junípero Serra and military forces under the command of Gaspar de Portolá, did not reach this area until 1769. The mission was intended to spread the Catholic faith among the region's Native peoples and establish and expand the reach of the Spanish Empire. The Spanish built San Diego de Alcalá, the first of 21 missions, at what developed as present-day San Diego in the southern part of the state along the Pacific. Military outposts were constructed alongside the missions to house the soldiers sent to protect the missionaries.

Spanish and Mexican rule were devastating for native populations. "As the missions grew, California's native population of Indians began a catastrophic decline." Gregory Orfalea estimates that pre-contact population was reduced by 33% during the Spanish and Mexican regimes. Most of the decline stemmed from imported diseases, low birth rates, and the disruption of traditional ways of life, but violence was common, and some historians have charged that life in the missions was close to slavery. However, according to George Tinker, a Native scholar, "The Native American population of coastal population was reduced by some 90 percent during seventy years under the sole proprietorship of Serra's mission system".

According to journalist Ed Castillo, Serra spread the Christian faith among the Native population in a destructive way that caused their population to decline rapidly while he was in power. Castillo writes that "The Franciscans took it upon themselves to brutalize the Indians, and to rejoice in their death...They simply wanted the souls of these Indians, so they baptized them, and when they died, from disease or beatings... they were going to heaven, which was a cause of celebration". According to Castillo, the Native American population were forced to abandon their "sustainable and complex civilization" as well as "their beliefs, their faith, and their way of life".

Response following statehood 
Following the American Conquest of California from Mexico, and the influx of settlers due to the California Gold Rush in 1849, California state and federal authorities incited, aided, and financed the violence against the Native Americans. The California Natives were also sometimes contemptuously referred to as "Diggers", for their practice of digging up roots to eat. On January 6, 1851, at his State of the State address to the California Senate, 1st Governor Peter Burnett said: "That a war of extermination will continue to be waged between the races until the Indian race becomes extinct must be expected. While we cannot anticipate this result but with painful regret, the inevitable destiny of the race is beyond the power or wisdom of man to avert." During the California genocide, reports of the decimation of Native Americans in California were made to the rest of the United States and internationally.

The California Act for the Government and Protection of Indians was enacted in 1850 (amended 1860, repealed 1863). This law provided for "apprenticing" or indenturing Indian children to Whites, and also punished "vagrant" Indians by "hiring" them out to the highest bidder at a public auction if the Indian could not provide sufficient bond or bail. This legalized a form of slavery in California. White settlers took 10,000 to 27,000 California Native Americans as forced laborers, including 4,000 to 7,000 children.

A notable early eyewitness testimony and account: "The Indians of California" (1864) is from John Ross Browne, Customs official and Inspector of Indian Affairs on the Pacific Coast. He systematically described the fraud, corruption, land theft, slavery, rape, and massacre perpetrated on a substantial portion of the aboriginal population. This was confirmed by a contemporary, Superintendent Dorcas J. Spencer.

Violence statistics 
In 1943, a study by demographer Sherburne Cook, estimated that there were 4,556 killings of California Indians between 1847 and 1865. Contemporary historian Benjamin Madley has documented the numbers of Californian Indians killed between 1846 and 1873; he estimates that during this period at least 9,492 to 16,092 Californian Indians were killed by non-Indians, including between 1,680 and 3,741 killed by the U.S. Army. Most of the deaths took place in what he defined as more than 370 massacres (defined as the "intentional killing of five or more disarmed combatants or largely unarmed noncombatants, including women, children, and prisoners, whether in the context of a battle or otherwise"). Madley also estimates that fewer than 1,400 non-Indians were killed by Indians during this period. The Native American activist and former Sonoma State University Professor Ed Castillo was asked by The State of California's Native American Heritage Commission to write the state's official history of the genocide; he wrote that "well-armed death squads combined with the widespread random killing of Indians by individual miners resulted in the death of 100,000 Indians in [1848 and 1849]." Another contemporary historian, Gary Clayton Anderson, estimated that no more than 2,000 Native Americans were killed in California.

List of recorded massacres

Population decline

Legacy

Land theft and value 

According to M. Kat Anderson, an ecologist and lecturer at University of California, Davis, and Jon Keeley, a fire ecologist and research scientist with the U.S. Geological Survey, after decades of being disconnected from the land and their culture, due to Spanish and U.S. colonial violence, Native peoples are slowly starting to be able to practice traditions that enhance the environment around them, by directly taking care of the land. Anderson and Keeley write, "The outcomes that indigenous people were aiming for when burning chaparral, such as increased water flow, enhanced wildlife habitat, and the maintenance of many kinds of flowering plants and animals, are congruent and dovetail with the values that public land agencies, non-profit organizations, and private landowners wish to preserve and enhance through wildland management". Through these returned practices, they are able to commit and practice their culture, while also helping the other people in the area that will benefit from the ecological differences.

Call for tribunals 
Native American scholar Gerald Vizenor has argued in the early 21st century for universities to be authorized to assemble tribunals to investigate these events. He notes that United States federal law contains no statute of limitations on war crimes and crimes against humanity, including genocide. He says:

Vizenor believes that, in accordance with international law, the universities of South Dakota, Minnesota, and California Berkeley ought to establish tribunals to hear evidence and adjudicate crimes against humanity alleged to have taken place in their individual states. Attorney Lindsay Glauner has also argued for such tribunals.

Apologies and name changes
In a speech before representatives of Native American peoples in June, 2019, California governor Gavin Newsom apologized for the genocide. Newsom said, "That's what it was, a genocide. No other way to describe it. And that's the way it needs to be described in the history books." After hearing testimony, a Truth and Healing Council will clarify the historical record on the relationship between the state and California Native Americans.

In November 2021, the board of directors of the University of California Hastings College of Law voted to change the name of the institution because of namesake S. C. Hastings' involvement in the killing and dispossessing of Yuki people in the 1850s.

Academic debate on the term "genocide" 
There is vigorous debate over the scale of Native American losses after the discovery of gold in California and whether to characterize them as genocide. The application of the term "genocide", in particular, has been controversial. According to historian Jeffrey Ostler, the debate mostly rests on disagreements regarding the definition of the term. He writes that, under a strict ("intentionalist") definition, "requiring a federal or state government intention to kill all California Indians and an outcome in which the majority of deaths were from direct killing, genocide does not seem applicable", while under a less strict ("structuralist") definition, "requiring only settler intention to destroy a substantial portion of California Indians using a variety of means ranging from dispossession to systematic killing, genocide seems apt".

For 
Proponents espousing the argument that the term "genocide" is appropriate, point out to the fact that the Indian population of California fell quickly and argue that extreme violence was integral to this process. Benjamin Madley, a UCLA historian, is one of the most prominent historians espousing this view, writing that "[i]t was genocide, sanctioned and facilitated by California officials". Historian Brendan C. Lindsay, argued that "rather than a government orchestrating a population to bring about the genocide of a group, [in California] the population orchestrated a government to destroy a group", while William T. Hagen wrote that "[genocide] is a term of awful significance, but one which has application to the story of California's Native Americans". James J. Rawls argued that Californian whites "advocated and carried out a program of genocide that was popularly called ‘extermination’". Historian Richard White, in a review of Madley's An American Genocide, has argued that "no reader of his book can seriously contend that what happened in California doesn’t meet the current definition of “genocide.”"  Ostler, too, endorsed the usage of the term, writing that it "rests on a substantial body of scholarship".

Against 
Other scholars and historians dispute the accuracy of the term "genocide" to describe what occurred in California, as well as the blame which has been placed directly on the federal government and the state government of California, pointing to the fact that disease was the primary factor in the depopulation of California Indians and arguing that mass violence was undertaken primarily by settlers and that the state and federal governments did not establish a policy of physically killing all Indians. One of the most prominent historians espousing such a view is Gary Clayton Anderson, a University of Oklahoma professor of history who describes the events in California as "ethnic cleansing", arguing that "If we get to the point where the mass murder of 50 Indians in California is considered genocide, then genocide has no more meaning". Historian William Henry Hutchinson, wrote that "the record of history disproves these charges [of genocide]", while historian Tom Henry Watkins stated that "it is a poor use of the term" since the killings weren't systematic or planned. Michael F. Magliari also criticizes the term, writing that "[Sherburne] Cook never described the terrible events of 1846–1873 as a genocide, and neither have any of his leading successors in California Indian history" and describing the term's application (especially under the UN Genocide Convention) "highly problematic".

See also 
 California Indian Wars
 California mission clash of cultures
 Comanche campaign
 Cupeño trail of tears
 Genocide of indigenous peoples
 1837 Great Plains smallpox epidemic
 List of Indian massacres
 List of genocides by death toll
 Long Walk of the Navajo
 Northern Cheyenne Exodus
 Serranus Clinton Hastings 
 Trail of Tears
 Yavapai Wars

Notes

Citations

References 

 
 
 
 
 
 
 
 
 
 
 
 
 
 

 
1846 establishments in Alta California
1873 disestablishments in California
19th century in California
California Mission Indians
History of racism in California
Massacres in the United States
Native American genocide
Native American history of California
Spanish missions in California
The Californias
Genocides in North America
Ethnic cleansing in the United States